The Personals is a 1998 Taiwanese comedy-drama film directed and co-written by Chen Kuo-fu, based on Jade Y. Chen's 1992 novel of the same name. The film follows a career woman (Rene Liu) as she encounters a diverse bunch of men after placing a personal advertisement in the newspaper. It was screened in the Un Certain Regard section at the 1999 Cannes Film Festival. Liu won Best Actress at the 1999 Asia-Pacific Film Festival.

Cast
Rene Liu as Du Jia-zhen, an ophthalmologist
Lo Pei-an as Lo Pei-an, Du Jia-zhen's former college instructor
Chen Chao-jung
Wu Bai
Ku Pao-ming
Chin Shih-chieh
Shih Yi-nan
Pu Hsueh-liang
Sisy Chen as herself
Doze Niu as himself

See also
Mr. Right Wanted, a 2014 Taiwanese TV series based on the same novel

References

External links

1998 films
1998 comedy-drama films
Taiwanese comedy-drama films
Films directed by Chen Kuo-fu
Films based on Taiwanese novels
Central Motion Picture Corporation films